Senator Brooke may refer to:

Basil Brooke, 1st Viscount Brookeborough (1888–1973), Northern Irish Senator from 1921 to 1922
Edward Brooke (1919–2015), U.S. Senator from Massachusetts from 1967 to 1979
Francis T. Brooke (1763–1851), Virginia State Senate
Walker Brooke (1813–1869), U.S. Senator from Mississippi from 1852 to 1853

See also
Senator Brooks (disambiguation)